Michèle Bernard-Requin (7 May 1943 – 14 December 2019) was a French lawyer and magistrate.

Biography
Bernard-Requin first worked as a lawyer at the Court of Appeal of Paris from 1966 to 1981. She then became procureur général in Rouen, then Nanterre, then Paris. She became a Councillor for the Court of Appeal of Paris in 2003, where she stayed until 2007. She also presided over Paris's Cour d'assises in 2006. She then moved to Martinique and served as General Councillor in Fort-de-France from 2007 to 2009.

Bernard-Requin died of cancer on 14 December 2019 at Sainte-Périne Hospital in Paris.

Publications
Juges accusés, levez-vous (2006)
Chroniques de prétoire : Histoires drôles et moins drôles (2011)

Filmography
Caught in the Acts (1994)
10th District Court: Moments of Trials (2004)
9 Month Stretch (2013)

Awards
Knight of the Legion of Honour (2000)
Officer of the Ordre national du Mérite (2005)

References

1943 births
2019 deaths
French women lawyers
People from Vosges (department)
Deaths from cancer in France
Chevaliers of the Légion d'honneur
Officers of the Ordre national du Mérite
21st-century French judges